Upu or Apu, also rendered as Aba/Apa/Apina/Ubi/Upi, was the region surrounding Damascus of the 1350 BC Amarna letters. Damascus was named Dimašqu / Dimasqu / etc. (for example, "Dimaški"-(see: Niya (kingdom)), in the letter correspondence.

The region is only referenced in three letters, EA 53, 189, and 197 (EA is for 'el Amarna'). Etakkama of Qidšu (Kadesh) in the Beqaa (named the Amqu) is in partial control, between allegiance to Pharaoh, and conjoining forces with the king of Hatti.

An example of the intrigue is from the last third of EA 53, (entitled: "Of the villain Aitukama"):

My lord, if he (i.e. pharaoh) makes this land a matter of concern to my lord, then may my lord send archers that they may come here. (Only) messengers of my lord have arrived here.
My lord, if Arsawuya of Ruhizzi and Teuwatti of Lapana remain in Upu, and Tašša (Tahash) remains in the Am[q], my lord should also know about them that Upu will not belong to my lord. Daily they write to Aitukama (Etakkama) and say as follows: "Come, tak[e] Upu in its entirety."
My lord, just as Dimaški (Damascus) in Upu (falls) at your feet, so may Qatna (fall) at your feet. My lord, one asks for life before my messenger. I do not fear [at al]l in the presence of the archers of my lord, since the archers belong to my lord. If he sends (them) to me, they will en[ter] Qatna.  -EA 53, (only lines 52-70(End)).

The intrigue of the three Amarna letters appears to involve areas to the north and northwest of Damascus, into Lebanon and the Beqaa (named Amqu).

And, for example Tašša, appears to be "Tahash," Tahaš, named after the biblical 'Tahash' personage; see: Patriarchs (Bible).

See also
Biridašwa, letter 197, Title: "Biryawaza's plight"
Etakkama

References

Moran, William L. (ed. and trans.) The Amarna Letters. Johns Hopkins University Press, 1992.

Aramean cities
Amarna letters locations
Ancient Damascus